Guillaume Dasquié (b. Cahors, 4 February 1966) is a French journalist and writer who specialises in matters of intelligence and terrorism.

Dasquié graduated in Law in Paris in 1990. The next year he obtained a masters in political science in Paris-I, and later worked for Canal + and BFM.

In February 1999, he became chief editor of Intelligence Online, a magazine specialising in politics and economic intelligence. Between 1999 and 2002, he taught at the University of Marne-la-Vallée about privatisation of intelligence and closed source intelligence; in March 1999, he published Secrètes affaires, a book about the subject.

In November 2001, along with Jean-Charles Brisard and Wayne Madsen, he co-authored Forbidden Truth, arguing that the Saudis play a double game, dealing with the West and financing radical Islamism.

The next year, along with Jean Guisnel, he co-authored L'Effroyable mensonge ("The Horrifying Lie") a point-by-point rebuttal of Meyssan's book 9/11: The Big Lie.

In 2003, he resigned from Intelligence Online, and published Les nouveaux pouvoirs ("New powers") about lobbies. He became research director at the IRIS, working on alleged Iraqi weapons of mass destructions. He also joined Flammarion to develop its investigation book line, an office he held until 2005.

In 2005, he published Al-Qaida vaincra, in which he accused the International Islamic Relief Organisation of financing violent radical Islamism.

On 17 April 2007, Dasquié published an article in le Monde in which he claimed that the DGSE has warned US authorities against plane hijacking as soon as January 2001. On 5 December 2007, Dasquié was arrested and charged for publication of classified information.

He was freed some days later. According to him, his freedom was obtained in change of accusing one person from its source who might be from the DGSE.

See also
September 11, 2001 attacks

References

External links
Official site

French journalists
Living people
1966 births
French male non-fiction writers